Lekas is a village and a former municipality in the Korçë County, southeastern Albania. At the 2015 local government reform it became a subdivision of the municipality Korçë. The population at the 2011 census was 392. The municipal unit consists of the villages Lekas, Marian, Gjonbabas, Gurmujas, Shkozan, Xerje, Tudas, Gjergjevicë, Lavdar, Brozdovec, Mazrek and Poponivë.

History 
The origin of the Muzaka family which ruled much of south-central Albania in the late 14th century is found in the village of Lavdar. The Holy Trinity Church (1370) was founded by Chiranna Muzaka near the village.

References

Former municipalities in Korçë County
Administrative units of Korçë
Villages in Korçë County